Mayum La, also known as Mariám La, is a mountain pass to the east of Lake Manasarovar. It separates the drainage divide of the  Dangque Zangbo, which is a headwater of Yarlung Tsangpo (Brahmaputra), and Langqen Zangbo  (Sutlej River) in Tibet.

References 

Mountain passes of Tibet
Mountain passes of China
Transhimalayas
Tibetan Plateau
Ngari Prefecture